The Elsenham & Thaxted Light Railway was a  long light railway in Essex, England. The line was sanctioned in 1906, although did not finally open to traffic until 1 April 1913. It was the last rail line built in Essex until the construction of Stansted Airport railway station.

The railway left the West Anglia Main Line at Elsenham. There were two stations (Sibleys and Thaxted) and three halts on the Railway; all except Mill Road Halt (opened in 1922) were opened with the line. The line was never a commercial success, since all the stations were located at some distance from the settlements they served; Thaxted station was  distant from the town, since to construct a crossing of the River Chelmer would have been too costly. The Engineer's Line Reference for the line is ELT.

As a light railway it was limited to  giving a journey time of 22–28 minutes.  There were five down and four up trains per day on opening.

Passenger services were withdrawn from 15 September 1952 and the railway finally closed on 1 June 1953.

References

External links
 Line on navigable O.S. map
 Photo of Elsenham Railway Station, 1 April 1913 on Flickr

Rail transport in Essex
Closed railway lines in the East of England
Railway companies established in 1906
Railway lines opened in 1913
Light railways
1906 establishments in England  
British companies established in 1906